VAQ-128, nicknamed the Fighting Phoenix, was an Electronic Attack Squadron of the U.S. Navy, based at NAS Whidbey Island, Washington. It was established on 9 October 1997 as an expeditionary EA-6B Prowler squadron to provide airborne radar jamming and deception support to Navy and Air Force units when the Air Force's EF-111A Raven was retired from service. The squadron included both Navy and Air Force personnel.

Operational history

Its deployments took VAQ-128 aircrews to Saudi Arabia, Turkey, Sicily and Japan in support of Operations Southern Watch, Desert Fox, Northern Watch and Iraqi Freedom. It returned from its final deployment in January 2004, and was deactivated in September of that year.

See also
 History of the United States Navy
 List of inactive United States Navy aircraft squadrons

References

Electronic attack squadrons of the United States Navy